The 2012–13 Nebraska Cornhuskers men's basketball team represented the University of Nebraska–Lincoln. Led by head coach Tim Miles, in his first season with the Cornhuskers. The team will play its home games in Bob Devaney Sports Center in Lincoln, Nebraska, and were a member of the Big Ten Conference. This was their final season at the Bob Devaney Sports Center before moving into their new arena, Pinnacle Bank Arena, for the 2013-14 season.

Incoming Recruits

Roster 

 
}

Schedule 

|-
!colspan=9| Exhibition

|-
!colspan=9| Regular season

|-
!colspan=9| Big Ten tournament
|-

References

Nebraska
Nebraska Cornhuskers men's basketball seasons
Nebraska Cornhuskers men's basketball
Nebraska Cornhuskers men's basketball